Rev. Jeremy Taylor, DMin, (1943 – January 3, 2018) was an American dream worker, author and Unitarian Universalist minister. He was a co-founder and past president of the International Association for the Study of Dreams.

He was known as a proponent of Projective Dreamwork, according to which participants in a dream group should not attempt to directly interpret the dreams of another participant. Rather they should preface their interpretation of a dream with a phrase such as 'If it were my dream...', and discuss the dream as if it were their own, in doing so acknowledging the fact that to some extent the interpreter always projects their own associations and life experience onto the dreamer. 

He is often associated with his theory that dreams come 'in the service of health and wholeness', rather than merely to reflect the dreamer's life and ambitions, or scare or mock the dreamer.

Publications

Books
 Dream Work (Paulist Press, 1983)
 Where People Fly And Water Runs Uphill (Warner Books, 1992)
 The Living Labyrinth (Paulist Press, 1998)
 The Wisdom of Your Dreams: Using Dreams to Tap Into Your Unconscious and Transform Your Life (Penguin/Tarcher, 2009)

References

External links
Official website

1943 births
2018 deaths
Unitarian Universalists
Unitarian Universalist clergy
American Unitarian Universalists
Oneirologists